America Oggi, or America Today, is an Italian-language daily newspaper published in Norwood, New Jersey, for Italian immigrants in the United States. It was founded by journalists of the closed Il Progresso Italo-Americano.

In May 2022, New York-based North Sixth Group purchased the global licensing rights to America Oggi and integrated it into America Domani, or America Tomorrow, a digital media community for Italian Americans. Publishing industry veteran Al DiGuido was named Publisher & CEO.

See also
ICN Radio
Italian language in the United States

External links

Italian-language newspapers published in the United States
Italian-American culture in New Jersey
Newspapers established in 1988
1988 establishments in New Jersey
Non-English-language newspapers published in New Jersey
National newspapers published in the United States